Gerhildiella is a monotypic genus of liverworts belonging to the family Lophoziaceae. It has only one known species, Gerhildiella rossneriana .

The genus was circumscribed by Riclef Grolle in Rev. Bryol. Lichenol. ser.2, vol.34 on page 187 in 1966.

The genus name of Gerhildiella is in honour of Gerhild Rossner.

References

Jungermanniales
Jungermanniales genera